Calico sheep is a type of sheep that has more than one colour within its coat.<ref name="PiebaldMutation">"A Piebald Mutation in Sheep: And a Suggested Interpretation" Journal of Heredity (1950), Vol. 41, No. 2, pp. 39-40; retrieved 2012-8-19.</ref>  The colouring is due to a piebald mutation, but the calico sheep is not a recognized breed.

These sheep tend to be very small due to intensive inbreeding and are often mislabeled as a true breed. Rather, they are mere crossbred sheep that have interesting colour patterns.

Genetics
The calico mutation is due to an autosomal recessive gene, first reported by Roberts.

History
Calico sheep are not related to the black and white sheep that are native to ancient Sudan and to South Africa.

The modern mutation was developed by breeding Shetland sheep with Barbados Blackbelly Sheep.

See also
 Calico cat

References

Further reading
 Richardson, Tracey. "Sheep earn their keep at winery," Owen Sound Sun Times'' (Canada). July 17, 2012; retrieved 2012-8-19.

Mutation
Sheep